100 Acres of Sycamore is the third studio album by Irish singer-songwriter Fionn Regan, released on 8 August 2011 on Heavenly Records. Unlike Regan's previous album, The Shadow of an Empire, which featured mostly rock and roll songs, the album foregrounds an acoustic aesthetic, similar to that of his debut, The End of History (2006).

Recorded in seven days, 100 Acres of Sycamore features a prominent string section throughout, and features backing vocal contributions from The Staves on the track, "North Star Lover".

Background and recording
Upon meeting actress Anna Friel in Benicassim, in 2010, Regan subsequently began writing 100 Acres of Sycamore whilst staying at her home in Deià, Majorca. Regarding the album's composition, Regan noted, "It was very fast, sometimes when you’re a writer it's like that, lightning strikes, the stars align for whatever reason. [...] The songs were very fast, they flew like liquid gold."

The album was recorded to tape using analogue methods, with Regan noting, "I just love the sound of it, I love the process. I love the idea that there's a master tape. It's a very potent thing." Regan and producer Sean Read recorded using the same console that The White Stripes used to record their fourth studio album, Elephant.

Writing and composition

Much of the album's material was written in Deià, Majorca, with Regan stating, "I think if you could bottle a bit of the atmosphere and put it into the record, it's there. In saying that, I think it's spliced with walking in the woods in Ireland. Regarding his time in Deia, Regan noted, "That probably had most impact on the writing of the record. It’s sort of a place that’s laced with magic, it has the quality of a book, everything there feels like a dreamlike overtone to it. So a lot of the writing on the record and the way it sounds is my impression or whatever way that wove its way into the writing and it came back out in the record."

Regarding the stylistc differences between 100 Acres of Sycamore and his previous album, The Shadow of an Empire, Regan noted, "The last album was kind of like a chrysalis and this is the butterfly. I think sometimes that everyone has to remember that you don't get 'this' without 'that'. This album wouldn't have happened without the last record. The second one wouldn't have happened without the first one. I think sometimes after the first record there might have been a feeling that, because I was on to a good thing, to just repeat it but I wasn't interested in that. It's very important for me to do what feels right at the time." Regan also noted, "My previous record, The Shadow Of An Empire was me looking out of a window at the world. With this one, it’s a clear look in."

Regan describes the track, "Sow Mare Bitch Vixen" as "a celebration of the femme fatale."

Track listing
All songs written and composed by Fionn Regan.
 "100 Acres of Sycamore" - 5:35
 "Sow Mare Bitch Vixen" - 3:46
 "The Horses are Asleep" - 4:39
 "The Lake District" - 5:37
 "Dogwood Blossom" - 3:25
 "For a Nightingale" - 3:44
 "List of Distractions" - 3:32
 "1st Day of May" - 2:27
 "North Star Lover" - 5:20
 "Woodberry Cemetery" - 1:44
 "Vodka Sorrow" - 6:04
 "Golden Light" - 1:35

Personnel

Musicians
 Fionn Regan - vocals, guitar, piano (11), banjo (9), xylophone (2), bells (2 & 4)
 Lascelle Gordan - drums, percussion
 Howard Gott - violin, glockenspiel (8), string arrangements
 Sarah Wilson - cello
 Ali Friend - double bass
 Sean Read - piano (1 4 6 & 7)
 The Staves - backing vocals (9)
 Jonny Bridgwood - double bass (9)

Production
 Fionn Regan - producer, mixing, engineer (12)
 Sean Read - producer, engineer
 Owen Morgan - engineer, mixing
 Seb Lewsley - engineer (9)
 Canice Mills - additional engineering
 Mandy Parnell - mastering
 Laura Murphy - production coordinator

Artwork
 Fionn Regan - artwork
 Swollen Design - layout, design

References

2011 albums
Fionn Regan albums
Heavenly Recordings albums